Eric V. Anslyn (born June 9, 1960, Santa Monica, California) is an American chemist , University Distinguished Teaching Professor, and Welch Regents Chair in Chemistry at the University of Texas at Austin. He previously held the Norman Hackerman Professorship. Prof. Anslyn is co-author of Modern Physical Organic Chemistry, an introductory graduate textbook.

Impact

Prof. Anslyn is notable for his work in developing designed receptors and sensor arrays by incorporating principal component analysis and discriminant analysis to mimic human taste and smell. Prof. Anslyn developed a colorimetric sensor to distinguish flavonoids (hydrolysis products of tannins) between varietals of red wines. An analogous colorimetric sensor was developed to mimic human taste by positioning polymer microbeads on a silicon chip. In related research, Prof. Anslyn designed a fluorometric chemical sensor consisting of a light-tight lego box and a smart phone to detect nerve agents such as VX and sarin.

Awards

Prof. Anslyn received one of the American Chemical Society Arthur C. Cope Scholar Awards awarded in 2006 for his research in pattern recognition and supramolecular chemistry and the Izatt-Christensen Award in Macrocyclic and Supramolecular Chemistry in 2013.

Education

Postdoctoral Work: [12/87-9/89] Columbia University, Research Advisor: Professor Ronald Breslow

Research: Mechanistic studies of ribonuclease A mimics. Detailed kinetics analyses of imidazole catalyzed 3'→5' UpU hydrolysis and isomerization. Synthesis and kinetics studies of bis-imidazole β-cyclodextrin catalyzed phosphodiester hydrolyses.
Ph.D., Chemistry: [11/87] California Institute of Technology, Research Advisor: Professor Robert Grubbs

Research: Mechanistic and theoretical studies of olefin metathesis and ring-opening metathesis polymerizations catalyzed by group IV and VI metals.
B.S., Chemistry: [5/82] California State University, Northridge

References

21st-century American chemists
University of Texas at Austin faculty
Columbia University alumni
1960 births
California State University, Northridge alumni
California Institute of Technology alumni
Living people